The 2007 Nottingham Open was the 2007 edition of the Nottingham Open men's tennis tournament that was part of the International Series of the 2007 ATP Tour. It was the 18th edition of the tournament and was held from 18 June until 25 June and played on outdoor grass courts at the Nottingham Tennis Centre in Nottingham, United Kingdom. Second-seeded Ivo Karlović won the singles title.

Finals

Singles

 Ivo Karlović defeated  Arnaud Clément, 3–6, 6–4, 6–4
 It was Karlović' 2ns singles title of the year and of his career.

Doubles

 Eric Butorac /  Jamie Murray defeated  Joshua Goodall /  Ross Hutchins, 4–6, 6–3, [10–5]

References

External links
 ATP singles draw
 ATP doubles draw